Suresh Raina (born 27 November 1986) is an Indian former international cricketer. He occasionally served as stand-in captain for Indian men's national cricket team during the absence of the main captain. He played for Uttar Pradesh (UP) in domestic cricket circuit. He is an aggressive left-handed middle-order batsman and an occasional off-spin bowler. He is the second-youngest player ever to captain India. He was the captain of Gujarat Lions in the Indian Premier League (IPL) , and he also served as vice-captain of the Chennai Super Kings. He is the first Indian batsman to hit a century in all three formats of international cricket.

On 15 August 2020, Raina announced his retirement from all formats of international cricket. He pulled out of the 2020 Indian Premier League due to personal reasons. On 6 September 2022, he announced his retirement from all forms of cricket, including IPL and domestic cricket.

Early life
Suresh Kumar Raina was born in Muradnagar of Uttar Pradesh on 27 November 1986 into a Kashmiri Pandit family, to parents from Rainawari, Srinagar district of Jammu and Kashmir. Raina lives in the Rajnagar neighborhood of Ghaziabad city. He has an older brother, Dinesh Raina. He studied in a boarding school.

Domestic career
In 2000, Raina decided to play cricket and subsequently moved from his hometown Muradnagar, Ghaziabad district to Lucknow, to attend the Guru Gobind Singh Sports College, Lucknow. He rose to become the captain of the Uttar Pradesh U-16s and came to prominence amongst Indian selectors in 2002 when he was selected at the age of  years for the U-19 tour to England, where he made a pair of half-centuries in the U-19 Test matches. He toured Sri Lanka later that year with the U-17 team.

He made his Ranji Trophy debut for Uttar Pradesh against Assam in February 2003 at the age of 16 but did not play another match until the following season. He debuted in List A Cricket against Madhya Pradesh at Indore in 2005 and scored 16 runs. He played for India green, UP under 16, India Blue, India Red, Rest of India, India under 19, Indian board's president's XI, Rajasthan Cricket association's president's XI, India seniors, Central zone. In Ranji trophy 2005-06 season he scored 620 in 6 games. In 2018 Akshdeep Nath replaced him as UP's Ranji trophy captain due to poor performance of scoring 105 runs in 9 innings averaging 11.66.

In late 2003, he toured Pakistan for the U-19 Asian ODI Championship before being selected for the 2004 U-19 World Cup, where he scored three half-centuries, including a 90 scored off only 38 balls. He was then awarded a Border-Gavaskar scholarship to train at the Australian Cricket Academy and in early 2005, he made his first-class limited overs debut, and scored 645 runs that season at an average of 53.75.

Indian Premier League 
Raina was awarded "best fielder" by the BCCI ahead of the finals of IPL 2010. He played a vital half-century which turned the final to Chennai's tide who ultimately went on to become the champions beating the Mumbai Indians. For his performances in 2010, he was named in the Cricinfo IPL XI.

For his performances in 2013, he was named in the Cricinfo CLT20 XI.

On 30 May 2014, he made 87 runs out of 25 balls against Kings XI Punjab in qualifier 2. He missed the fastest century of the cricketing history by just 13 runs due to a runout. For his performances in 2014, he was named in the Cricinfo IPL XI  and Cricinfo CLT20 XI.

In 2016, Raina was signed for the Gujarat Lions after the suspension of CSK. He captained the team for the season, and remained consistent with batting, scoring 399 runs in 15 innings. Raina had to leave for the Netherlands in between of season 9 for birth of his first child thus making him miss his first ever match in nine seasons of IPL.

On the occasion of the 10 year anniversary of IPL, he was also named in the all-time Cricinfo IPL XI.

He was named in the Cricbuzz IPL XI of the tournament for 2017.

In IPL 2018, Raina was retained by the returning Super Kings for a price tag of 11 crore ($1.7 million). During the second game of the tournament, Raina suffered a calf injury, due to which he was ruled out of the next two games.

On 23 March 2019, in the first match of the 12th edition of the tournament against RCB, he became the first batsman to score 5000 runs in the IPL.

In 2020, Raina flew to UAE where the IPL was to be played due to the ongoing COVID-19 pandemic with the Super Kings squad but days later returned to India and withdrew from the 2020 season of IPL citing personal reasons.

In 2021, Raina became the fourth player in IPL history to play 200 matches, behind MS Dhoni, Rohit Sharma and Dinesh Karthik.

He went unsold in the 2022 IPL Auctions. He then became a commentator for the tournament.

Other franchise cricket
In September 2022 he signed a contract with the Road Safety World Series league and played for 'Indian Legends' team.

International career 

Raina was one of the few best fielders during his time with Indian team. He played in middle order.

During the semi-final of 2011 Cricket World Cup, Raina batted with tailenders to score an unbeaten 36, a significant contribution to India's final tally of 260.

Apart from a half-century in the first Test of India tour of England 2011 at Lord's, Raina managed just 27 runs from seven innings. He struggled against short bowling and in the final Test was out for a 29-ball duck, the longest in India's Test history.

In the second ODI of  Indian tour of Sri Lanka 2012, he was out for 1 but he came back stronger in the third ODI where he played 45 balls 65 to hand India a five-wicket win and he eventually also won the man of the match award for his performance. Gambhir too scored a century in that match. After the Tour of Sri Lanka, when the England team came to India, he was dropped and his spot was given to Yuvraj Singh, who made a comeback after suffering from cancer.

He was named as 12th man in the 'Team of the Tournament' for the 2012 T20 World Cup by the ICC.

His knock of 100 against England during England tour of India  2012–13 at Cardiff was nominated to be one of the best ODI batting performance of the year by ESPNCricinfo.

Raina was not selected in India's first tour to USA, where they played against West Indies for 2 T20Is. However, he made a re-entry to the ODI team for a series against New Zealand. Later he was ruled out due to Chikungunya .

In October 2018, he was named in India C's squad for the 2018–19 Deodhar Trophy.

In 2011, India toured West Indies after the World Cup with captain MS Dhoni rested and vice-captain Virender Sehwag injured. Gautam Gambhir was named the captain for the ODIs and T20's with Raina as his deputy. But due to injury, Gautam Gambhir was ruled out with Raina captaining with Harbhajan Singh as his deputy. During the 2014 Bangladesh series, he led his team to a 2–0 victory in the series. During the 2nd match of the series, India was all out for 105 runs while batting first.  Suresh Raina and his team successfully defended the total of 105 runs, winning the match by 47 runs.

Raina announced his retirement from all formats of international cricket on 15 August 2020, minutes after the retirement of Mahendra Singh Dhoni. On Instagram, Raina said "It was nothing but lovely playing with you, @mahi7781. With my heart full of pride, I choose to join you in your journey. Thank you India. Jai Hind."

Playing style 
Raina is an attacking middle order left handed batter. He had more success in limited over cricket than in test. He has weakness of short pitched balls and throughout his career opposition teams tried to exploit this weakness. Also in Ranji trophy he has struggled against short balls. He has been widely criticised for his short ball weakness. He is part time off break bowler. His favourite scoring area is mid wickets on side. Most of the times he plays inside out off drive shot. While trying to hit on off side, he creates room for himself.

Personal life
Suresh Raina's father Trilokchand Raina was a military officer in an ordinance factory. His family left 'Rainawari' in Jammu and Kashmir union territory of India amid the exodus of Kashmiri Hindus in the 1990s and settled down in Muradnagar town, Ghaziabad district, Uttar Pradesh. Raina trained in the Guru Gobind Singh sports college, Lucknow in 1998. Raina has a sister and his one elder brother is in Indian Army.

Raina married Priyanka on 3 April 2015. They have two children.

Raina's uncle Ashok Kumar was assaulted during a robbery in their house in Punjab, and didn't survive. Due to this, Raina withdrew from 2020 IPL season to be with his family.

Raina received an honorary doctorate from Vels University on 5 August 2022.

Achievements 

 He was the first Indian player to score 6000 as well as 8000 runs in his Twenty20 career.
 He is the first ever cricketer to reach 5,000 runs in IPL.
 He holds the record of most no.of catches (107)  in the IPL.
 He is the second after Chris Gayle and first Indian player to hit 100 sixes in the IPL.
 He is the highest run scorer in the CLT20 (842 runs)
 He holds the record for scoring the most fifties in Champions League T20 history(6)
He holds the record for the most runs scored in the powerplay in an IPL match

References

External links

 

1986 births
Living people
Kashmiri Pandits
People from Ghaziabad, Uttar Pradesh
Sportspeople from Ghaziabad, Uttar Pradesh
People from Ghaziabad district, India
Indian cricketers
India Test cricketers
Cricketers who made a century on Test debut
India One Day International cricketers
India Twenty20 International cricketers
Uttar Pradesh cricketers
Central Zone cricketers
Cricketers from Ghaziabad, Uttar Pradesh
Chennai Super Kings cricketers
Cricketers at the 2011 Cricket World Cup
Cricketers at the 2015 Cricket World Cup
India Green cricketers
India Blue cricketers
Gujarat Lions cricketers
University of Lucknow alumni
Guru Gobind Singh Sports College, Lucknow alumni